Andromache Books is a United Kingdom based, independent, not-for-profit publishing firm, run as a writers' cooperative by the writers themselves. It was founded in 2008 by authors Grace Andreacchi and Elisabeth Serafimovski in London. Andromache Books specialises in literary fiction and poetry, with a particular interest in postmodern and experimental literature. Authors to date include Grace Andreacchi, Mikael Covey, Mark Edwards, Gabriel Olearnik and artist Alexandra Rozenman.

Andromache Studio
Under the imprint Andromache Studio, they also publish plays for the modern theatre.

External links
Official site
Interview with Editor Grace Andreacchi

Book publishing companies of the United Kingdom